Max Jorgensen is a professional Australian rugby union player who plays as a winger of Australian Super Rugby team the New South Wales Waratahs. Max is the son of former rugby union and rugby league player Peter. A New South Wales Waratahs academy product and schoolboy representative, Jorgensen reportedly turned down an offer from National Rugby League (NRL) club Sydney Roosters. 

After being brought into the senior squad for the upcoming 2023 Super Rugby season, Jorgensen was named as a starter for the Waratahs in their first round match against Australian Super Rugby rivals, the ACT Brumbies, at home. Playing the full match, Jorgensen scored two tries for the Waratahs. However the Waratahs lost 25–31.

References

External links

 Max Jorgensen | Rugby Database Profile

 

2004 births 
Rugby union players from Sydney 
New South Wales Waratahs players
Rugby union wings
Living people 
People educated at St Joseph's College, Hunters Hill
Rugby union fullbacks
Australian rugby union players